Hypochrosis rufescens is a moth of the family Geometridae first described by Arthur Gardiner Butler in 1880. It is found in India, China and Taiwan.

References

Moths described in 1880
Hypochrosini